Santiago is a census-designated place (CDP) in Grays Harbor County, Washington, United States. The population was 42 at the 2010 census.

The community is in the Quinault Indian Nation in western Grays Harbor County, along State Route 109, next to the Pacific Ocean. SR 109 leads north  to its northern terminus at Taholah and south  to Moclips. The Copalis National Wildlife Refuge occupies the ocean and rocks seaward from the coastline along Santiago and environs.

References

Census-designated places in Grays Harbor County, Washington
Quinault settlements